Mason Neck State Park is located in Fairfax County, Virginia. The park is on a peninsula formed by Pohick Bay on the north, Belmont Bay on the south and the Potomac River to the east. The park also contains white-tailed deer and many species of lichen.

Mason Neck State Park is one of the best locations to view bald eagles in northern Virginia.  Sightings are most common in the mornings and evenings.

The park is day-use only, and maintains a visitors center that is open from 10 a.m. to 6 p.m.

Mason Neck State Park has cultural significance with two sites on the state and National Register of Historic Places and approximately thirty other identified archaeological sites. The Taft archaeological site was listed in 2004 and the Lexington site was listed in 2013.

References

External links
 Virginia Department of Conservation and Recreation: Mason Neck State Park 
 

State parks of Virginia
Parks in Fairfax County, Virginia
Protected areas established in 1985
Protected areas of Fairfax County, Virginia